The dark-rumped swift (Apus acuticauda) is a species of swift in the family Apodidae.
It is found in Bhutan and Northeast India and is a vagrant to Thailand.
Its natural habitat is subtropical or tropical moist lowland forests.
It is threatened by habitat loss.

References

External links
BirdLife Species Factsheet.

dark-rumped swift
Birds of Bhutan
Birds of Northeast India
dark-rumped swift
Taxonomy articles created by Polbot